= Timothy Training Institute =

Christian organization

- Founded: 1986
- Purpose: Equipping Christian leaders
- Region served: Africa

Timothy Training Institute (TTI) is a non-denominational Christian mission, equipping church leaders with thorough Biblical knowledge and life-application studies, to enable them to better serve their communities and lead their congregations.

== History ==
Timothy Training Institute was founded in 1986 by Christians, representing various Christian organizations, from several countries across Africa, including South Africa, Mozambique, Zimbabwe, Malawi, Angola etc. when they received the vision (with the emphasis on "Christian leadership training") to equip church leaders, as many church leaders across Africa have no formal training.

Timothy Training Institute, then known as Project Timothy, began to formally train church leaders in Mozambique, in 1986. The training became popular and soon a large number of church leaders began to implement their newly acquired knowledge and skills in their communities.

In the early 1990s, after the success of the training in Mozambique, Timothy Training Institute began conducting classes in South Africa. The training was very successful and soon classes were offered in all of the provinces of South Africa; the Timothy Training Institute also received more requests from various SADC countries.
